Jacques Van Assche (4 August 1905 – 11 June 1972) was a Belgian wrestler. He competed in the men's freestyle light heavyweight at the 1928 Summer Olympics.

References

1905 births
1972 deaths
Belgian male sport wrestlers
Olympic wrestlers of Belgium
Wrestlers at the 1928 Summer Olympics
Place of birth missing